Bug is an unincorporated community located in Clinton County, Kentucky, United States. Its post office is closed.

The origin of the name "Bug" is obscure.

References

Unincorporated communities in Clinton County, Kentucky
Unincorporated communities in Kentucky